"Devil's Gun" is a 1977 song by C. J. & Company from the album of the same name. "Devil's Gun" was written by Barry Green (also known as Barry Blue), Ron Roker, and Gerry Shury and produced by Mike Theodore and Dennis Coffey.

Along with the tracks "We Got Our Own Thing" and "Sure Can't Go to the Moon", the song went to number one for five weeks on the Billboard disco/dance chart. The single also peaked at #2 on the R&B chart. and at #36 on the Billboard Hot 100.
The song's longevity had it barely cut the 1977 year-end chart despite its low peak position, at #100. The song would remain the lowest peaked song to appear in the year end for 37 years, and even unmatched for 20 years.

Chart performance

Popular culture
The song is notable for being the first record played at the opening of Studio 54 on April 26, 1977, by DJ Richie Kaczor.
The instrumental portions of "Devil's Gun" were featured prominently in the International version of Crocodile.
It was also featured in the film "The Real Bruce Lee". 
In 2016 the song was rediscovered due to its inclusion in The Get Down soundtrack.
In 2017 it was featured in the film "BORG Vs McENROE" on General release in the UK and Europe and due out in 2018 in the USA. 
The song's latest inclusion will be in the documentary being made of "Studio 54" due soon.

See also 
 List of number-one dance singles of 1977 (U.S.)

References

1977 singles
1977 songs
Disco songs
Songs written by Barry Blue
Songs written by Ron Roker
Songs written by Gerry Shury